Machiavel is the traditional French rendition of the surname of the Italian philosopher Niccolò Machiavelli.

In English, it may refer to:  
Machiavellianism (politics), especially a stock type of villain in Elizabethan drama (also Machievel)
Machiavel (band), a Belgian rock band